William M. Wilson (1799–1871) was an English botanist, known for his focus on bryology.

Life
The second son of Thomas Wilson, a druggist, he was born at Warrington (which was then in Lancashire, and later transferred to Cheshire) on 7 June 1799. He was educated at Prestbury Grammar School and under Dr John Reynolds at the dissenting academy in Leaf Square, Manchester. He was then articled to a firm of solicitors in Manchester; but fell ill. This led to his love of botany, and when he was about 25, his mother gave him an allowance so that he could devote himself entirely to it.

In 1821 Wilson discovered Cotoneaster cambricus on Great Orme's Head. It brought him into correspondence with Sir James Edward Smith, who encouraged him. In 1827 John Stevens Henslow introduced him to William Jackson Hooker.

Wilson spent nearly two years in Ireland, where he studied mosses, which from 1830 took his whole attention. From 1829 onward he was frequently quoted in Hooker's British Flora. He became well known in his field.

Death
Wilson died at Paddington, two miles from Warrington, on 3 April 1871, and was buried in the nonconformist burial-ground, Hill Cliff, Warrington. He had married in 1836 a widowed cousin, Eliza Lane.

Works

Wilson was entrusted with the description of the mosses collected in the voyages of HMS Erebus and HMS Terror under  James Clark Ross (expedition to Antarctica from 1839 to 1843), and of HMS Herald under Henry Kellett. He made an early account of Tasmanian mosses, describing many novelties.

Wilson entered into correspondence with specialists: Sextus Otto Lindberg and Wilhelm Philippe Schimper. His major work was the Bryologia Britannica (1855) intended as a third edition of the Muscologia Britannica (1818) of Hooker and Thomas Taylor, but was substantially a new work. Over a hundred new species of British mosses were then added to the list between its publication and his death.

Besides the Cotoneaster, Wilson added a new species of rose, a fern, and many mosses to the British list, the rose Rosa Wilsoni being named after him by William Borrer, and the Wilson's filmy fern named Hymenophyllum wilsonii by Hooker. Wilson described many new species of exotic mosses in the Journal of Botany. His papers were enumerated in the Royal Society's Catalogue (vi. 389, viii. 1249), and his herbarium and botanical correspondence went to the Natural History Museum.

References

Further reading
 Assorted papers from the Herbarium of William Wilson

Attribution

English botanists
People from Warrington
1799 births
1871 deaths